The benthic zone is the ecological region at the lowest level of a body of water such as an ocean, lake, or stream, including the sediment surface and some sub-surface layers. The name comes from ancient Greek, βένθος (bénthos), meaning "the depths."  Organisms living in this zone are called benthos and include microorganisms (e.g., bacteria and fungi) as well as larger invertebrates, such as crustaceans and polychaetes. Organisms here generally live in close relationship with the substrate and many are permanently attached to the bottom. The benthic boundary layer, which includes the bottom layer of water and the uppermost layer of sediment directly influenced by the overlying water, is an integral part of the benthic zone, as it greatly influences the biological activity that takes place there. Examples of contact soil layers include sand bottoms, rocky outcrops, coral, and bay mud.

Description

Oceans
The benthic region of the ocean begins at the shore line (intertidal or littoral zone) and extends downward along the surface of the continental shelf out to sea. Thus, the region incorporates a great variety of physical conditions differing in: depth, light penetration and pressure. The continental shelf is a gently sloping benthic region that extends away from the land mass. The continental slope drops down to the deep sea floor. The ocean floor is not all flat but has submarine ridges and deep ocean trenches known as the hadal zone.

For comparison, the pelagic zone is the descriptive term for the ecological region above the benthos, including the water column up to the surface. Depending on the water-body, the benthic zone may include areas that are only a few inches below water, such as a stream or shallow pond; at the other end of the spectrum, benthos of the deep ocean includes the bottom levels of the oceanic abyssal zone.

For information on animals that live in the deeper areas of the oceans see aphotic zone. Generally, these include life forms that tolerate cool temperatures and low oxygen levels, but this depends on the depth of the water.

Lakes
As with oceans, the benthic zone is the floor of the lake, composed of accumulated sunken organic matter. The littoral zone is the zone bordering the shore; light penetrates easily and aquatic plants thrive. The pelagic zone represents the broad mass of water, down as far as the depth to which no light penetrates.

Organisms

Benthos are the organisms that live in the benthic zone, and are different from those elsewhere in the water column; even within the benthic zone variations in such factors as light penetration, temperature and salinity give rise to distinct differences, delineated vertically, in the groups of organisms supported. Many organisms adapted to deep-water pressure cannot survive in the upper parts of the water column: the pressure difference can be very significant (approximately one atmosphere for each 10 meters of water depth).  Many have adapted to live on the substrate (bottom). In their habitats they can be considered as dominant creatures, but they are often a source of prey for Carcharhinidae such as the lemon shark.

Because light does not penetrate very deep into ocean-water, the energy source for the benthic ecosystem is often marine snow. Marine snow is organic matter from higher up in the water column that drifts down to the depths. This dead and decaying matter sustains the benthic food chain; most organisms in the benthic zone are scavengers or detritivores. Some microorganisms use chemosynthesis to produce biomass.

Benthic organisms can be divided into two categories based on whether they make their home on the ocean floor or a few centimeters into the ocean floor. Those living on the surface of the ocean floor are known as epifauna. Those who live burrowed into the ocean floor are known as infauna. Extremophiles, including piezophiles, which thrive in high pressures, may also live there. An example of benthos organism includes invertebrates (Chorismus antarcticus).

Nutrient flux
Sources of food for benthic communities can derive from the water column above these habitats in the form of aggregations of detritus, inorganic matter, and living organisms. These aggregations are commonly referred to as marine snow, and are important for the deposition of organic matter, and bacterial communities.  The amount of material sinking to the ocean floor can average 307,000 aggregates per m2 per day. This amount will vary on the depth of the benthos, and the degree of benthic-pelagic coupling. The benthos in a shallow region will have more available food than the benthos in the deep sea. Because of their reliance on it, microbes may become spatially dependent on detritus in the benthic zone. The microbes found in the benthic zone, specifically dinoflagellates and foraminifera, colonize quite rapidly on detritus matter while forming a symbiotic relationship with each other.

Habitats
Modern seafloor mapping technologies have revealed linkages between seafloor geomorphology and benthic habitats, in which suites of benthic communities are associated with specific geomorphic settings. Examples include cold-water coral communities associated with seamounts and submarine canyons, kelp forests associated with inner shelf rocky reefs and rockfish associated with rocky escarpments on continental slopes. In oceanic environments, benthic habitats can also be zoned by depth. From the shallowest to the deepest are: the epipelagic (less than 200 meters), the mesopelagic (200–1,000 meters), the bathyal (1,000–4,000 meters), the abyssal (4,000–6,000 meters) and the deepest, the hadal (below 6,000 meters).

The lower zones are in deep, pressurized areas of the ocean. Human impacts have occurred at all ocean depths, but are most significant on shallow continental shelf and slope habitats.  Many benthic organisms have retained their historic evolutionary characteristics. Some organisms are significantly larger than their relatives living in shallower zones, largely because of higher oxygen concentration in deep water.

It is not easy to map or observe these organisms and their habitats, and most modern observations are made using remotely operated underwater vehicles (ROVs), and rarely submarines.

Ecological research
Benthic macroinvertebrates have many important ecological functions, such as regulating the flow of materials and energy in river ecosystems through their food web linkages. Because of this correlation between flow of energy and nutrients, benthic macroinvertebrates have the ability to influence food resources on fish and other organisms in aquatic ecosystems. For example, the addition of a moderate amount of nutrients to a river over the course of several years resulted in increases in invertebrate richness, abundance, and biomass. These in turn resulted in increased food resources for native species of fish with insignificant alteration of the macroinvertebrate community structure and trophic pathways. The presence of macroinvertebrates such as Amphipoda also affect the dominance of certain types of algae in Benthic ecosystems as well. In addition, because benthic zones are influenced by the flow of dead organic material, there have been studies conducted on the relationship between stream and river water flows and the resulting effects on the benthic zone. Low flow events show a restriction in nutrient transport from benthic substrates to food webs, and caused a decrease in benthic macroinvertebrate biomass, which lead to the disappearance of food sources into the substrate.

Because the benthic system regulates energy in aquatic ecosystems, studies have been made of the mechanisms of the benthic zone in order to better understand the ecosystem. Benthic diatoms have been used by the European Union's Water Framework Directive (WFD) to establish ecological quality ratios that determined the ecological status of lakes in the UK. Beginning research is being made on benthic assemblages to see if they can be used as indicators of healthy aquatic ecosystems. Benthic assemblages in urbanized coastal regions are not functionally equivalent to benthic assemblages in untouched regions.

Ecologists are attempting to understand the relationship between heterogeneity and maintaining biodiversity in aquatic ecosystems. Benthic algae has been used as an inherently good subject for studying short term changes and community responses to heterogeneous conditions in streams. Understanding the potential mechanisms involving benthic periphyton and the effects on heterogeneity within a stream may provide a better understanding of the structure and function of stream ecosystems. Unfortunately periphyton populations suffer from high natural spatial variability while difficult accessibility simultaneously limits the practicable number of samples that can be taken. Targeting periphyton locations which are known to provide reliable samples  especially hard surfaces  is recommended in the European Union benthic monitoring program (by Kelly 1998 for the United Kingdom then in the EU and for the EU as a whole by CEN 2003 and CEN 2004) and in some United States programs (by Moulton et al 2002). Benthic gross primary production (GPP) may be important in maintaining biodiversity hotspots in littoral zones in large lake ecosystems. However, the relative contributions of benthic habitats within specific ecosystems are poorly explored and more research is needed.

See also

Armor (hydrology)
Benthic fish
Benthopelagic fish
Bottom trawling
Deep sea
Intertidal zone
Lake stratification
Littoral zone
Neritic zone
Photic zone
Profundal zone
Sediment Profile Imagery
Stream bed
Tide pool

References

External links

Data Archive for Seabed Species and Habitats from the UK Marine Data Archive Centre

Aquatic biomes
Aquatic ecology
Fisheries science
Oceanographical terminology